Minuscule 598 (in the Gregory-Aland numbering), Aν31Νλ35 (von Soden), is a Greek minuscule manuscript of the New Testament, on paper. Palaeographically it has been assigned to the 13th century. The manuscript has complex contents. It was labeled by Scrivener as 466.

Description 

The codex contains the text of the Gospel of Luke on 58 paper leaves (size ). The text is written in two columns per page, 50-74 lines per page. It contains also a commentary and various Patristic matter. All codex has 320 leaves.

Text 

Aland did not place the Greek text of the codex in any Category. It was not examined by using the Claremont Profile Method.

History 

The manuscript was added to the list of New Testament manuscripts by Scrivener. It was examined by Dean Burgon. Gregory saw it in 1886.

The manuscript currently is housed at the Biblioteca Marciana (Gr. Z. 494 (331), fol. 1-58), at Venice.

See also 

 List of New Testament minuscules
 Biblical manuscript
 Textual criticism

References

Further reading 

 

Greek New Testament minuscules
13th-century biblical manuscripts